Tyler John Simpson (28 August 198526 May 2011) was an Australian football (soccer) player who played as a central defender or right back. He was the twin of fellow footballer Jordan Simpson.

Career
Simpson played in the NSW Premier League with Blacktown City Demons, APIA Leichhardt and Sydney Olympic. He had short stints in the A-League with Perth Glory and then-Queensland Roar. Simpson also played for a short time in Armenia with Dinamo-Zenit Yerevan.

It was a shock to many fans and supporters of football in Australia when his death, which was later disclosed to be suicide, was announced on 26 May 2011. A minute's silence was held as a mark of respect and remembrance to Simpson before the Round 10 clashes between Blacktown City Demons and South Coast Wolves and Sydney Olympic and Rockdale City Suns. As a mark of respect the Olyroos (Australian under 23s) wore black armbands in their friendly against Japan on 1 June 2011 in Niigata.

See also
List of Perth Glory FC players (1–24 appearances)

References

1985 births
2011 deaths
A-League Men players
Australian soccer players
Soccer players from Sydney
People educated at Epping Boys High School
Brisbane Roar FC players
Perth Glory FC players
Sydney Olympic FC players
Blacktown City FC players
Australian twins
Twin sportspeople
Association football defenders
Suicides in New South Wales